2002 in professional wrestling describes the year's events in the world of professional wrestling.

List of notable promotions 
These promotions held notable shows in 2002.

Calendar of notable shows

January

February

March

April

May

June

July

August

September

October

November

December

Accomplishments and tournaments

AAA

Ring of Honor

WWF/E

Awards and honors

Pro Wrestling Illustrated

Wrestling Observer Newsletter

Wrestling Observer Newsletter Hall of Fame

Wrestling Observer Newsletter awards

Title changes

NJPW

WWF/E 
 – Raw
 – SmackDown

Following the introduction of the brand extension in March, titles became exclusive to a brand. Only the promotion's original world championship and women's championship were non-exclusive until later in the year.

Debuts
Black Peral 
Bobby Fish
Candice LeRae
Chase Stevens
Chris Masters
Chuck Taylor
Dave Mastiff
Eddie Edwards
Ethan Carter III
Ivelisse Vélez
Johnny Jeter
Mike Kanellis
Mike Mizanin
Mike Mondo
Petey Williams
Tommy End
Travis Tomko
January 23 – Shachihoko Boy
March 2 – 
Alex Shelley
Kazuhiko Ogasawara
Silas Young
February 9 - El Ligero
March 16 – Zach Gowen
April 20 – DJ Nira
May (Unknown what specific date) - Sheamus
May 11 – Taiji Ishimori
May 18 – Toru Yano
May 10 – Karl Anderson
June 2 – Mikey Batts
June 5 – James Ellsworth
July 14 – Sami Zayn (Then known as El Generico)
July 27 – Special K
August 10 – Montel Vontavious Porter
August 29 – Shinsuke Nakamura
October 2 – Matt Morgan
October 12 – Eddie Kingston, Yoshi Tatsu
October 21 – Yoshihiro Sakai
November 9 – Sylvan Grenier
November 11 – Becky Lynch
December 27 – Fred Sampson

Retirements
Black Bart (wrestler) (1975-2002) 
Bushwhacker Luke (1962-2002) (first retirement, returned to wrestling in 2007)
Rip Morgan (1983-2002)
Stevie Ray (1989-2002) (first retirement, return to wrestling in 2015 and retired in 2017) 
Butch Reed (1978-2002) (first retirement, returned to wrestling in 2005 and retired in 2013)

Births
 April 25 – Miyu Amasaki
 July 24 – Tomoka Inaba
 October 1 – AZM

Deaths

 January 7 – Mighty Igor, 70
 January 9 - Les Kellett, 86
 February 3 – Nelson Royal, 66 
 February 19 – Swede Hansen, 68 
 March 1 – Dino Casanova, 35
 March 7 – Troy Graham, 52
 March 17 - Big Red, 51 
 April 3 – Bobby Managoff, 84
 April 11 – Stanley Weston, 82
 April 18 – Wahoo McDaniel, 63
 April 28 – Lou Thesz, 86
 May 5 – Randy Anderson, 42
 May 14 – George Gordienko, 74
 May 16 – Shoichi Arai, 36
 May 16 – Big Dick Dudley, 34
 May 18 – Davey Boy Smith, 39
 August 1 – Don Owen, 90
 August 22- Abe Zvonkin, 92
 September 21 – Rocco Rock, 49
 October 31 - Moose Cholak, 72 
 November 19 - Kangaroo Kennedy, 76 
 November 20 - Billy Goelz, 84
 November 23 – Billy Travis, 41
 November 29 - George "Two Ton" Harris, 74/75
 November 30 - Mr. Wrestling, 68

See also
List of FMW supercards and pay-per-view events
List of WWA pay-per-view events
List of WWF/E pay-per-view events

References

 
professional wrestling